Sweet Memories is an album by country artist Willie Nelson. It was released in 1979.

The album consisted of older songs produced with an added string section.

Track listing
Songs written by Willie Nelson except where noted.
 "Sweet Memories" (Mickey Newbury) – 3:12
 "Everybody's Talkin'" (Fred Neil) – 3:23
 "Wonderful Future" – 2:37
 "December Day" – 2:16
 "Help Me Make It Through the Night" (Kris Kristofferson) – 2:56
 "Both Sides Now" (Joni Mitchell) – 2:59
 "Wake Me When It's Over" – 3:46
 "Little Things" (Willie Nelson, Shirley Nelson) – 3:17
 "Buddy" – 2:15
 "Will You Remember" – 3:34

Charts

Weekly charts

Year-end charts

References

1979 compilation albums
Willie Nelson compilation albums
RCA Victor compilation albums